MC2 may refer to:

Maison de la Culture de Grenoble, a venue for performances in Grenoble, France
Marvel Comics 2 is an imprint from Marvel Comics whose comic books depict an alternative future timeline for the Marvel Universe
E = mc² is the equation for mass-energy equivalence
Microids, a French software company formerly known as MC2-Microïds and later just MC2
MC2, an alternate symbol for ACTH receptor
Midnight Club 2 a street racing game released in 2003.
 Project Mc2

See also
 E=MC2 (disambiguation)
 MCMC (disambiguation)
 MCC (disambiguation)
 MC (disambiguation)